Jessica Manley' (born 1985) is a British actress who has had appearances in a number of films and numerous plays and TV series. She is mostly known for playing Margot Frank in the award-winning TV miniseries Anne Frank: The Whole Story.

Life and career

Jessica is the daughter of Andrew Manley, a stage director. Her grandparents, who were Jewish, emigrated to Britain just a few years before the Second World War. Jessica made her acting debut at the age of five, in a play staged in the regional theatre. She is best known for playing Margot Frank, sister of Anne Frank, in the TV film :Anne Frank: The Whole Story (2001). She studied classical acting and graduated from the Guildhall School of Music and Drama in 2006 and now works in the U.S. and U.K. in theatre, television and films. She most recently has been developing site-specific pieces for Listed Theatre.

Selected filmography
 Anne Frank: The Whole Story (2001) (TV)- :Margot Frank
 Veils (2007) (short film)- Miriam
 Lewis (2009) (TV series)- Jo (1 episode)
 The Wolfman (2010)- Gypsy mother
 Exploitation'' (2011) (short film)- The Drunk

References

External links

British actresses
Living people
1985 births
British film actresses
British stage actresses
British television actresses